Hinna Church is a parish church of the Church of Norway in the southern part of the large Stavanger Municipality in Rogaland county, Norway. It is located in the borough of Hinna in the southern part of the city of Stavanger. It is the church for the Hinna parish which is part of the Ytre Stavanger prosti (deanery) in the Diocese of Stavanger. The brick church was built in a rectangular design in 1967 using designs by the architects Eyvind Retzius and Svein Bjoland. The church seats about 700 people. The church was consecrated on 29 October 1967.

See also
List of churches in Rogaland

References

Churches in Stavanger
Brick churches in Norway
20th-century Church of Norway church buildings
Churches completed in 1967
1967 establishments in Norway